Shotei Ibata is a Japanese calligrapher and performance artist living in Kyoto, Japan. He is perhaps best known for his public demonstrations of Japanese calligraphy using a huge (up to 6 feet long) brush. He is also notable for his work, "to move calligraphy deeper into the modern world of art.": Japanese calligraphy is usually a very private activity, but he would work in front of large audiences, holding many performances in a variety of countries around the world. He is the subject of the book, Shotei Ibata: Rock Music And Big Brush, written by Ildegarda E. Scheidegger.

References

Bibliography
Ibata Shotei artwork presented by Gunnar Nordstrom Gallery
 
 
 

Japanese calligraphers
Japanese performance artists
Living people
Year of birth missing (living people)